Tillandsia edithae is a cliff dwelling caulescent species from Bolivia which has a beautiful red flowered inflorescence when in bud. Tillandsia edithae is one of the few tillandsias to have coral coloured flowers making it a very attractive flower. It produces a lot of adventitious offsets along the base of the stem. These flowers are quite rare.

Description 
Tillandsia edithae produces "pups" at the base and along the stem. These flowers have beautiful crimson red blooms and quick growing roots. They have alternating stiff or leathery strap-shaped leaves. Leaf colour varies from silver to shades of green blushed with other bright colours. Leaf texture is soft or ridged and leaves are covered in scales or hairs (trichomes) that collect water and nutrients for the plant.

Cultivars 
 Tillandsia 'Lisa's Jewell'
 Tillandsia 'Peach Parfait'

References 

edithae
Endemic flora of Bolivia
Plants described in 1974